Zbroyar is a privately owned Ukrainian weapons manufacturer that specializes in the production of high-precision sports and hunting rifles.

Zbroyar became more prominent with the appearance in the range of self-loading rifles Z-15 and Z-10.

History
Zbroyar was founded in 2007 as a specialized small-scale production of high-precision sports and hunting rifles. The company became famous thanks to its Z-008 rifle, on the basis of which military models were developed, which in some respects surpassed more expensive foreign counterparts.

The company started its activity with a small fleet of machines on leased areas of the Kyiv Radio Plant. In 2013, the production was reorganized and technically modernized. As a result, specialists with experience in the defense and aerospace industries joined, and their number increased to more than 80 people.

Recognition
The Ukrainian Z-008 rifle team won second place at the European F-Class Championships in 2011 and 2012.

References

External Links
  

Firearm manufacturers of Ukraine
Defence companies of Ukraine
Manufacturing companies established in 2007
Manufacturing companies based in Kyiv
Ukrainian companies established in 2007